Majda Ankele-Samaluk (born 6 October 1940) is a Slovenian alpine skier. She competed at the 1964 Winter Olympics and the 1968 Winter Olympics, representing Yugoslavia.

References

External links
 

1940 births
Living people
Slovenian female alpine skiers
Olympic alpine skiers of Yugoslavia
Alpine skiers at the 1964 Winter Olympics
Alpine skiers at the 1968 Winter Olympics
Sportspeople from Kranj